Jeff Andretti (born April 14, 1964) is a former American race car driver. He competed in CART, and was the series' Rookie of the Year in 1991.

Personal life
Jeff is the youngest son of Dee Ann (Hoch) and legendary Italian-born 1969 Indy 500 Champion and 1978 Formula 1 World Champion Mario Andretti, younger brother of Michael Andretti, and uncle of Marco Andretti. Jeff is the nephew of Mario's twin Aldo Andretti and cousin of Aldo's sons John Andretti and Adam Andretti. The Andretti family became the first family to have four relatives (Michael, Mario, Jeff, and John) compete in the same series (CART).

Racing career

In 1983, Jeff was racing in Formula Fords, winning both the USCA Pro Ford Championship and the Skip Barber Formula Ford Eastern Series. After qualifying for his Sports Car Club of America national license in 1984, he won the Northeast Division title in Formula Ford. In the November, he made his Formula Super Vee debut at Caesars Palace, Las Vegas.

He continued in Formula Super Vee the following season, with the Ralt America outfit, winning the third race of the season, on the Milwaukee Mile. In the CART race at the same event, Mario did the same, marking the first time a father and son had started from pole and won races on the same track, in the same weekend. Jeff would also win in Cleveland and Phoenix, on his way the fifth in the Robert Bosch/Valvoline Championship.

1986 saw Andretti move into the new American Racing Series with Ralph Sanchez Racing. Like his Milwaukee win the previous year, his only race win was a "family affair". He earned his first ARS victory at Pocono, as his father wins the CART race at the same meeting, after his brother, Michael had started from pole, giving the Andretti family a "clean sweep." Jeff would go on and finish second the overall ARS standing. For 1987, Jeff switched to Arciero Racing for another attempt at ARS, winning the opening race of the season, in Phoenix. He would revisit the top step of the podium in the series finale, in the race around Tamiami Park, Miami, snatching second place in the championship away from Tommy Byrne    in the process.

After in quiet 1988, Andretti took a new challenge for 1989, competing in the Toyota Atlantic, while developing a new chassis. Although the season was winless, he did earn Rookie of the Year honours, on his to sixth in the Atlantic Division.

He moved into the CART ranks in 1990, joining his father and brother, making racing history, making it the first time a father has competed against his two sons in a CART race. After failing to qualifier for the Indianapolis 500, he make his race debut with TEAMKAR International in their Lola-Cosworth T89/00 in the Miller Genuine Draft 200 on the Milwaukee Mile, only to suffer mechanical problems and not finish. He sat out the rest of the season, returning in 1991, doing a full season with Bayside Disposal Racing, driving their Texaco Havoline Star sponsored Lola-Cosworth T91/00. With four top ten finishes throughout the season, three of which were the first three races, the best being a 7th place in the Gold Coast IndyCar Grand Prix; the race incidentally won by his cousin, John, earning the CART Rookie of the Year title.

In May 1991, Jeff would qualify 11th for the Indianapolis 500, coupled with an outstanding performance before mechanical problems earned him the Indy 500 Rookie of the Year title. He followed his Mario and Michael in making it the first time ever, that three members of the same family have achieved this.

Earlier that year, Jeff joined Mario and Michael to race for Jochen Dauer Racing in the SunBank 24 at Daytona. Although their Porsche 962C was classified in fifth place, they failed to finish due to overheating.

Without for full-time drive for 1992, Andretti returned to the Indianapolis Motor Speedway with A. J. Foyt Enterprises. Unfortunately, he became yet another victim of the infamous Andretti Curse at the famed race track when on lap 109, a right rear wheel came loose off his car at Turn 2 and he crashed violently head-on into the wall, smashing both his legs. He spent three weeks at the Methodist Hospital in Indianapolis, before the long road to recovery, determined to race again in 1993.

It was February 1993, when Andretti set the (then) unofficial closed-course speed record for IndyCars of 234.50 mph, the fastest speed ever recorded at Texas World Speedway, while testing for the Indianapolis 500.  This marked his first time back in an IndyCar since the accident the previous year. Andretti's fast run came at the conclusion of two days of testing where he consistently posted laps in the 230 mph range.  Andretti's Buick-powered Lola was prepared by Pagan Racing. It was at the Indy, that Jeff made his complete his comeback, only to record a third straight DNF.

The accident severely hampered Andretti's career, at least in terms of his competitiveness, since he was never the same afterwards. In 1994, Jeff did a one-off race with Euromotorsports, finishing 17th in the Slick 50 200, held at the Phoenix International Raceway, albeit 21 laps adrift. Come May, Jeff had switched to Hemelgarn Racing, but his bid for a fourth consecutive start failed due to a blown Buick engine.

He later managed, however, to come back and race full-time in the Indy Lights with Canaska Racing in 1995, but recorded just one top-ten finish. For 1996, he stepped away from open-wheel racing and joined the tin-top brigade, racing to seventh place overall in the North American Touring Car Championship in a Leitzinger Racing prepared Ford Mondeo. After a gap of three year, he moved to the NASCAR Craftsman Truck Series, driving the No. 94 Chevrolet for Enerjetix Motorsports,  he raced in three events in 1999, posting a best finish of 30th at the Milwaukee Mile.

Andretti is now retired from competitive racing, and works as a driving instructor.

Racing record

Career highlights

SCCA National Championship Runoffs

Complete 24 Hours of Daytona results

Complete 12 Hours of Sebring results

American Open Wheel racing results
(key)

American Racing Series / Indy Lights

CART

Indianapolis 500

NASCAR
(key) (Bold – Pole position awarded by qualifying time. Italics – Pole position earned by points standings or practice time. * – Most laps led.)

Craftsman Truck Series

North American Touring Car Championship
(key)

References

External links

 
 Jeff Andretti at Champ Car Stats
 Official Andretti family website

Living people
1964 births
Sportspeople from Bethlehem, Pennsylvania
Racing drivers from Pennsylvania
Indianapolis 500 drivers
Indianapolis 500 Rookies of the Year
Champ Car drivers
Indy Lights drivers
Atlantic Championship drivers
SCCA Formula Super Vee drivers
NASCAR drivers
24 Hours of Daytona drivers
12 Hours of Sebring drivers
IMSA GT Championship drivers
American people of Italian descent
Jeff
SCCA National Championship Runoffs participants
Nazareth Area High School alumni
A. J. Foyt Enterprises drivers
EuroInternational drivers
North American Touring Car Championship drivers